Schenkenberg may refer to:

 Groß Schenkenberg
 Marcus Schenkenberg (born 1968), model
 Schenkenberg Castle
 Schenkenberg, Brandenburg
 Schenkenberg, Vienna